Nicolás Castro may refer to:
Nicolás Castro (footballer, born 1990), Argentine footballer
Nicolás Castro (footballer, born 2000), Argentine footballer